Maxibon  is a brand of ice cream sandwich made by Froneri. It consists of a block of ice cream containing small chocolate chips with one end covered in chocolate, and the other sandwiched between two biscuits.

History
The Maxibon is an ice cream sandwich produced for the first time in Italy by Motta (Italgel) in 1989 and then brought to international markets by Nestlé starting from 1993 when Nestlé acquired Italgel.
Since 2016, the brand has been owned by Froneri, a joint venture between the English R&R Ice Cream and Nestlé itself.

The Maxibon bar is available in Europe, Canada, Australia, Chile, Egypt and New Zealand and can be purchased from 'Maxibon Zone' stands in European cities, such as Madrid. There are three available variations of Maxibon in Europe including vanilla, white chocolate and original flavour. There are also specials released from time to time, with unique flavors as well.

Varieties
There have been at least ten known varieties of Maxibon:
 Classic: (also called Vanilla) Made of vanilla ice cream with chocolate chips, with a half biscuit, half chocolate shell, together with hazelnuts and crumbs of biscuit.
 Honeycomb: A variant of the traditional Maxibon with honeycomb flavoured ice cream in place of vanilla.
 Caramel Rough Nut: the same shape as the original Maxibon, but with caramel ice cream instead of vanilla, and ripples of caramel sauce through the half of the ice cream that's encased in biscuit
 Peanut Butter and Jam: Peanut butter flavoured ice cream throughout with jam ripples in the biscuit section.
 Iced Coffee: Iced coffee flavoured ice cream with chocolate chips, with half encased in the classic chocolate and the other half sandwiched between two biscuits. Also sold as Maxi-Dare, made with Dare Iced Coffee.
 Monster Cookie: Cookies and cream flavoured ice cream with chocolate cookie bits, with half encased in the classic chocolate with crunchy cookie pieces and the other half sandwiched between two biscuits.
 Krispy Kreme: A collaboration with Krispy Kreme donuts with a flavour based on their original glazed doughnut. Available in Australia for a limited time.
Pickle Rick Mint: Mint-flavoured ice cream with mint choc-chip ice cream, a collaboration with the Rick and Morty cartoon.
Waffle: Vanilla ice cream with caramelised sugar pieces jammed between two honeycovered waffle biscuits on one side and dipped in caramel white choc with hazelnuts and cookie crumb on the other side.
Cereal: With cereal and covered in white chocolate

Previous variants
 Cookie: Circular, with ice cream, chocolate chips and caramel sauce sandwiched between two chocolate chip 'cookies'.
 Snack: A half sized version of the original Maxibon, weighing 56g instead of the standard 102g.
 Risk: Regular size and shape however the flavour of ice cream, either vanilla, honeycomb or mint, was not known until the package was opened.

References 

Ice cream brands
Nestlé brands
Cookie sandwiches
Ice cream sandwiches
Chocolate-covered foods